Lanshan County is a county of Hunan Province, China, it is under the administration of Yongzhou prefecture-level City.

Located on the south margin of the province, it is adjacent to the northern border of Guangdong. In 2015, it had a registered population of 400,200 and a permanent resident population of 339,100. The county has eight towns and six ethnic townships of Yao people under its jurisdiction. The county seat and the largest town is Tafeng.

Geography and climate
Lanshan is a mountainous county located in the east of Jiuyi Mountains on the northern side of the middle Nanling Range. The county is bordered to the southwest by Jianghua County, to the northwest by Ningyuan County, to the northeast by Jiahe County, to the east by Linwu County, to the southeast by Lianzhou City of Guangdong.

There are 69 rivers with drainage area of more than 10 square kilometers or length of more than 5 kilometers, most rivers belong to the Yangtze River system, less to the Pearl River system. The county is the source place of the Xiang River, originating from Yegou Mountain in Zhulin Village of Xiangjiangyuan Town.

Administrative divisions
8 towns
 Citangxu
 Maojun
 Nanshi
 Suocheng
 Tafeng
 Taipingxu
 Tushi
 Xinyu

6 Yao ethnic townships
 Daqiao
 Huiyuan
 Jiangdong
 Jingzhu
 Litou
 Xiangjiangyuan

Transportation
The G55 Expressway runs through the middle land north to south, the G76 Expressway passes through the north of the county west to east, they meet at Citangyu Town in the north. the two national expressways and the other three Hunan Provincial Highway of S216, S322 and S324 form the main road network connecting the county.

References

External links 

 
County-level divisions of Hunan
Yongzhou